Karaburun is a village (administratively a neighborhood) of Arnavutköy  district in Istanbul Province, northwestern Turkey

Location
It is situated north of the villages Durusu and Yeniköy.

Overview
With its long and wide sand beach, Karaburun is a popular tourist destination being the second-most visited Black Sea seaside resort in the European part of Istanbul Province after Kilyos. As of 2020, the population of the village is 1,730. The population, being 1,354 in 2013, has been in steady increase since then. The headman of the village is Mustafa Karaali.

Facilities
Primary health care is provided by Mustafa Yenigün Family Health Center. The village has a primary school and three mosques, Merkez Mosque, Alperenler Mosque and Hz. Hamza Mosque.  There are three public parks in the settlement, Karaburun Park, Nevbahar Park and Erguvan Park. The Port of Karaburun is home to offshore fishing boats.

Lighthouse
A lighthouse is situated atop a  hill on the cape (Karaburun means literally "Cape Black"), on the site of a ruined Genovese castle. It was erected by French engineers in 1860, following the Crimean War (1853–1856). Royal Navy personnel then established a marine salvage service. The light is ranked third in the world in terms of luminous power.

The original lighthouse structure is reasonably well-preserved. It features decorative lion-head figures as hoppers on the eaves of the lighthouse's original copper dome. Rainwater accumulated on the eaves is designed to flow from the open mouths of the lions. The pole in the garden and the long rope stretched to the pole have been used for years to rescue passengers with the chairlift system if a ship is stranded in shallow waters in bad weather conditions.

References

Seaside resorts in Turkey
Fishing communities in Turkey
Tourist attractions in Istanbul Province
Arnavutköy, Istanbul
Ports and harbours of the Black Sea